Tricholita ferrisi is a moth of the family Noctuidae. It is only known from Onion Saddle in the Chiricahua Mountains and Ash Canyon in the Huachuca Mountains of extreme south-eastern Arizona at elevations between 1,575 and 2,325 metres. This is the Madrean Sky Islands region of the northern Sierra Madre Occidental's sky islands.

All known specimens were collected by light trap in late July.

External links
A Revision of Lasionycta Aurivillius (Lepidoptera, Noctuidae) for North America and notes on Eurasian species, with descriptions of 17 new species, 6 new subspecies, a new genus, and two new species of Tricholita Grote

Moths described in 2009
Hadeninae
Chiricahua Mountains